Petrie is a relatively small lunar impact crater that is located to the east of the much larger walled plain Fabry. To the east is the smaller crater Rayet. Most of the rim of Petrie is sharp-edged, with a deposit of scree along the base of the inner wall. There is an outward bulge to the rim along the southwest, where the surface has slumped into the interior.

Satellite craters
By convention these features are identified on lunar maps by placing the letter on the side of the crater midpoint that is closest to Petrie.

References

 
 
 
 
 
 
 
 
 
 
 
 

Impact craters on the Moon